Anna Kristīne Gornela (born 9 September 1997) is a Latvian footballer who plays as a midfielder for PAOK and the Latvia national team.

International career
Gornela made her debut for the Latvia national team on 30 November 2021, against England.

References

1997 births
Living people
Women's association football midfielders
Latvian women's footballers
Latvia women's international footballers
Latvian expatriate sportspeople in Sweden
Expatriate women's footballers in Sweden
Sundsvalls DFF players
Elitettan players
American people of Latvian descent
American women's soccer players
Oral Roberts Golden Eagles women's soccer players